Glasgow Caledonian University GAC (Irish: Cumann Lúthchleas Gael Ollscoile Chailleannacht Ghlaschú) is the university Gaelic Football club representing Glasgow Caledonian University. The club was established by the university's Irish Student Society in 2007 and formed a link up with local club Tir Conaill Harps. The club competed in the British University Gaelic football Championship in 2008 but was forced to withdraw from the 2009 tournament after it was postponed.

2009/10 Season
The club clinched their first trophy by winning the Scottish University Gaelic Football League B Division title, pipping city rivals University of Glasgow to the post. Having secured the league title, the club followed up the previous years disappointment with a spirited display in the 2010 British Championships. The tournament saw them narrowly miss out on a place in the semi-finals, although their performances earned them plaudits. GCU followed their disappointment in the British Championships by defeated Abertay at Stepps to clinch a place in the final of the Scottish University Gaelic Football Championships. The final of the champions took place against University of Stirling in Stirling. After a heated and sometimes ill-tempered contest, GCU clinched the championship with some ease to secure the first double in their history.

Honours 
 Scottish University Gaelic Football League B Division
Winners: 2010
 Scottish University Gaelic Football B Championships
Winners: 2010

Sports teams in Glasgow
Gaelic football clubs in Scotland
2007 establishments in Scotland
Glasgow Caledonian University